Legends is the fifth studio album by American hip hop group Above the Law. It was released in 1998 via Tommy Boy Records. The record peaked at number 27 on the Top R&B/Hip-Hop Albums and number 142 on the Billboard 200.

Audio production of the entire album was handled by Cold 187um with co-production by KM.G and K-oss. The sixteen track record featured guest appearances from Ha-Ha L.O.C. of Pomona City Rydaz, Yukmouth, Jayo Felony, Young Ten, Madd Harv Dogg, and Big Rocc.

Track listing

Personnel 

 Gregory Fernan Hutchinson - executive producer, producer, mixing (tracks 11–12, 15), keyboards
 Kevin Michael Gulley - executive producer, co-producer
 Anthony Stewart - executive producer, co-producer
 Donovan Smith - mixing & recording (tracks 1–10, 13–14, 16)
 Jay Gonzalez - recording (tracks 11–12, 15)
 Brian Gardner - mastering
 Michael Sims - guitar, bass
 Gary "Sugarfoot" Greenberg - drums
 Julie Griffin - backing vocals
 Traci Nelson - backing vocals
 Nicole Hithe - backing vocals (track 15)
 Ian Steaman - A&R
 Michael Miller - photography
 Dave Conrad - digital editing
 James Savage - featured artist (track 2)
 Jerold Ellis - featured artist (track 14)
 Jerry Brown - featured artist (track 16)
 Ha-Ha L.O.C. - featured artist (track 5)
 Young Ten - featured artist (track 6)
 Madd Harv Dogg - featured artist (track 13)

References

1998 albums
Above the Law (group) albums
Tommy Boy Records albums
Albums produced by Cold 187um